SM2 or SM-2 may refer to:

Spider-Man 2, the second Spider-Man film released in 2004
Superman II, the second Superman film released in 1980
Scary Movie 2, the second Scary Movie film released in 2001
Spiritual Machines 2, the Our Lady Peace album set for release in 2021
VR Class Sm2, a type of commuter train in Finland
SM2, the SM postcode area covering Belmont, South Sutton and East Ewell in England
Pindad SM2, an Indonesian general purpose machine gun
Standard Missile 2, either of two US missiles:
RIM-66 Standard (SM-1MR/SM-2MR), a medium-range surface-to-air missile, the successor of the RIM-24 Tartar missile
RIM-67 Standard (SM-1ER/SM-2ER non-VLS capable), an extended range surface-to-air missile, the successor of the RIM-2 Terrier missile
SM-2, Royal Navy Second Submarine Squadron (motto: "Second to None") Hunter-Killer boats based in HM Naval Base Devonport
Song Meter SM2, a bird monitoring recorder from Wildlife Acoustics
PZL SM-2, a Polish light utility helicopter also known as the WSK SM-2
SM-2 (algorithm), one of the computer algorithms used in SuperMemo
SM-2, a research nuclear reactor at RIAR
Super Mario Bros. 2, a 1998 Nintendo Entertainment System game
sm² (also known as Surrealism 2), an unreleased mod based on the Modern Warfare 2 game engine Call of Duty: Modern Warfare 2
SM2, a Chinese signature and encryption algorithm, see SM9 (cryptography standard).